Gun of a Preacher Man is a live album of Amen, released August 2, 2005 by Snapper / Secret Records. The album is a recording of a February 1, 2003 show in Manchester, England.

Track list
All tracks recorded February 1, 2003 in Manchester.

References

2005 live albums
Amen (American band) albums